The Affectionately Stakes was an American Thoroughbred horse race run between 1976 and 2015 at New York's Aqueduct Race Track.

The one and one-sixteenth mile listed stakes event was for fillies and mares, three-years-old and up, offering a purse of $100,000 added.  Through 2004 it was a Grade III Stakes.

The race was named for the great racing filly Affectionately. She was ranked Number 81 in the Blood-Horse magazine List of the Top 100 U.S. Racehorses of the 20th Century. Affectionately was called the "Queen of Aqueduct" during her racing days.

In 1976 the race was run at one mile.  In 1977, 1983, and 1985, it was run in two divisions.

Records
Speed record:
 1:41.87 @ 1-1/16 miles: Sweetzie (1998)

Most wins:
 Plankton (1980, 1981)
 Zonk (2002, 2003)

Most wins by a jockey:
 3 - José A. Santos (1987, 1988, 2006)

Most wins by a trainer:
 3 - Todd Pletcher (2006, 2012, 2014)

Most wins by an owner:
 2 - Barry K. Schwartz (1982, 2007)
 2 - Fox Hill Farms, Inc. (2002, 2003)

Past winners

 2013 – Twice the Lady (5) (Cornelio Velásquez)
 2012 – Love and Pride (4)
 2011 – No race?
 2010 – Tidal Dance (5) (Ramon A. Dominguez)
 2009 – Yet Again (Orlando Bocachica)
 2008 – Stage Luck (4) (Stewart Elliott)
 2007 – Great Intentions (5) (Norberto Arroyo Jr.)
 2006 – Bohemian Lady (5) (José A. Santos)
 2005 – Saintliness (5) (Richard Migliore)
 2004 – Austin's Mom (4) (Pablo Fragoso)
 2003 – Zonk (5) (Charles C. Lopez)
 2002 – Zonk (4) (Charles C. Lopez)
 2001 – Pentatonic (6) (Aaron Gryder)
 2000 – Theresa the Teacha (5) (Heberto Castillo Jr.)
 1999 – Biding Time (5) (Aaron Gryder)
 1998 – Sweetzie (6) (Julio Pezua)
 1997 – Mil Kilates (4) (Jorge Chavez)
 1996 – Lotta Dancing (5) (Heberto Castillo Jr.)
 1995 – Sea Ditty (4) (Art Madrid Jr.)
 1994 – Poolesta (5) (Frank Lovato Jr.)
 1993 – Hilbys Brite Flite (4) (John Velazquez)
 1992 – Get Lucky (4) (Mike E. Smith)
 1991 – My Treasure (4) (Carlos Lopez)
 1990 – Naskra's Return (4) (Mike E. Smith)
 1989 – Rose's Cantina (5) (Eddie Maple)
 1988 – Tricky Squaw (5) (José A. Santos)
 1987 – Squan Song (6) (José A. Santos)
 1986 – Lady On The Run (4) (Ángel Cordero Jr.)
 1985 – Descent (5) (Robert Thibeau Jr.)
 1985 – Sintrillium (7) (Robbie Davis)
 1984 – Am Capable (4) (Ángel Cordero Jr.)
 1983 – Adept (4) (Karen Rogers)
 1983 – Polite Rebuff (4) (Frank Lovato Jr.)
 1982 – Perfect Poppy (5) (Victor Molina)
 1981 – Plankton (5) (Ruben Hernandez)
 1980 – Plankton (4) (Ruben Hernandez)
 1979 – Kit's Double (6) (Antonio Graell)
 1978 – One Sum (4) (Ruben Hernandez)
 1977 – Shy Dawn (6) (Daryl Montoya)
 1977 – Illiterate (5) (Steve Cauthen)
 1976 – Proud Delta (4) (Jorge Velásquez)

References

External links
Aqueduct's Official Website

Mile category horse races for fillies and mares
Discontinued horse races in New York City
Aqueduct Racetrack
Recurring sporting events established in 1976
Recurring sporting events disestablished in 2016